96 Aquarii is a multiple star system in the zodiac constellation of Aquarius. The designation is from the star catalogue of English astronomer John Flamsteed, first published in 1712. It is faintly visible to the naked eye with an apparent visual magnitude of 5.56. The estimated distance to this system, based upon an annual parallax shift of 29.27 mas, is around 111 light years. The system has a relatively large proper motion and it is moving closer to the Sun with a radial velocity of −7 km/s.

The visible components, A and B, have an angular separation of 9.8 arc seconds and share a common proper motion. Their presumed orbital period is estimated as 4,400 years. Component A was first identified as a single-lined spectroscopic binary by Adams et al. (1924) at the Mount Wilson Observatory. It has an orbital period of 21.2 days with an eccentricity of 0.60. Magnitude 10.92 component B is likewise a single-lined spectroscopic binary, having an orbital period of 659.9 days and an eccentricity of 0.70. The separation of Bab is 45 mas, and their spectrum matches a red dwarf class of M3 V.

References

F-type main-sequence stars
M-type main-sequence stars
Spectroscopic binaries
4
Aquarius (constellation)
Aquarii, 096
Durchmusterung objects
219877
115142
8868